The Convention concerning Hours of Work on Board Ship and Manning or Hours of Work and Manning (Sea) Convention, 1936 is  an International Labour Organization Convention which never entered into force. It was established in 1936, and closed for ratification on 24 February 2002, when the 1996 Convention concerning Seafarers' Hours of Work and the Manning of Ships entered into force.

Revisions
The convention was revised by the Convention concerning Wages, Hours of Work on Board Ship and Manning of 1946 as well as its 1949  and 1958 revision, none of which entered into force. The entry into force of the 1996 Convention concerning Seafarers' Hours of Work and the Manning of Ships (which also revised the convention) in 2002 signified the end of the opening for signature of the convention.

Ratifications
The convention was ratified by three countries, but automatically denounced by two upon entry into force of the 1996 Convention for those countries. The convention is not legally binding upon any state.

External links 
Text.
Ratifications.

International Labour Organization conventions
Working time
Hours of Work on Board Ship and Manning
Hours of Work on Board Ship and Manning
Admiralty law treaties
1936 in labor relations